Rydell is both a surname and a given name. Notable people with the name include:

Surname
Bobby Rydell (1942–2022), American singer, mainly of rock and roll music
Ewa Rydell (born 1942), Swedish artistic gymnast and 1963 European Championships medallist
Ingvar Rydell (1922–2013), Swedish football player
Mark Rydell (born 1928), American actor, film director and producer
Rick Rydell (born 1963), American talk radio host, outdoorsman, writer and author
Rickard Rydell (born 1967), Swedish racing driver
Sven Rydell (1905–1975), Swedish footballer

Given name
Rydell Booker (born 1981), heavyweight boxer
Rydell Melancon (born 1962), American football player
Rydell Poepon (born 1987), Dutch footballer

See also
Rydel, given name and surname